The Kentucky Intercollegiate Athletic Association was a short-lived intercollegiate athletic football conference that existed from 1907 to 1916. The league had members, as its name suggests, in the state of Kentucky.

Champions

1907 –  Kentucky State
1914 – Transylvania
1915 – Transylvania
1916 – Centre (KY)

See also
List of defunct college football conferences
Kentucky Intercollegiate Athletic Conference

References

Defunct college sports conferences in the United States
College sports in Kentucky
1914 establishments in Kentucky
1916 disestablishments in Kentucky